Vulcănița may refer to the following rivers in Romania:

 Vulcănița, a tributary of the Holbav in Brașov County
 Vulcănița (Homorod), a right tributary of the river Homorod in Brașov County
 Vulcănița, a tributary of the Vulcana in Dâmbovița County